The West Bengal football team, currently known as DTDC Bengal for sponsorship reason, is an Indian football team representing West Bengal in Indian state football competitions including the Santosh Trophy. They were the second Indian team to participate in the continental top tier tournament – Asian Champion Club Tournament, by playing in the 1970 edition following Mysore in 1969.

History
Bengal made its debut in the national competitions at the 1941–42 Santosh Trophy. West Bengal have appeared in the Santosh Trophy finals 45 times, having won 32 titles, the most by any team. Managed by Balaidas Chatterjee, the team won six Santosh Trophy titles between 1949 and 1959. In 1962, former Indian captain Samar Banerjee guided Bengal winning the trophy.

Prior to 2003, the team competed as "Bengal football team". On 16 August 2021, West Bengal played a friendly match against India national team at the Salt Lake Stadium and it was won by India by 1–0. In October 2022, West Bengal managed by Biswajit Bhattacharya clinched gold at the 36th National Games of India, defeating Kerala 5–0 in final.

Team 
The following 22 players were called up prior to the 2022–23 Santosh Trophy qualification round.

Honours 
 Santosh Trophy
 Winners (32): 1941–42, 1945–46, 1947–48, 1949–50, 1950–51, 1951–52, 1953–54, 1955–56, 1958–59, 1959–60, 1962–63, 1969–70, 1971–72, 1972–73, 1975–76, 1976–77, 1977–78, 1978–79, 1979–80, 1981–82, 1982–83 (Shared with Goa), 1986–87, 1988–89, 1993–94, 1994–95, 1995–96, 1996–97, 1997–98, 1998–99, 2009–10, 2010–11, 2016–17
 Runners-up (14): 1944–45, 1946–47, 1952–53, 1960–61, 1964–65, 1965–66, 1967–68, 1968–69, 1974–75, 1985–86, 2006–07, 2008–09, 2017–18, 2021–22

National Games
 Gold medal (3): 1994, 2011, 2022
 Silver medal (2): 1985, 2002
 Bronze medal (1): 1999

 B.C. Roy Trophy
 Winners (18): 1961–62, 1966–67, 1967–68, 1969–70, 1973–74, 1974–75, 1976–77, 1977–78, 1980–81, 1981–82, 1983–84, 1984–85, 1986–87, 1989–90, 1994–95, 1995–96, 2003–04, 2017–18
 Runners-up (7): 1975–76, 1987–88, 1999–00, 2006–07, 2007–08, 2009–10, 2010–11

 Mir Iqbal Hussain Trophy
 Winners (12): 1965–66, 1978–79, 1985–86, 1989–90, 1993–94, 1994–95, 1998–99, 1999–00, 2000–01, 2003–04, 2007–08, 2015–16
 Runners-up (7): 1987–88, 1988–89, 1996–97, 2001–02, 2005–06, 2006–07, 2008–09

 M. Dutta Ray Trophy
 Winners (6): 1992, 1996, 2000, 2002, 2004, 2005
 Runners-up (7): 1993, 1995, 1997, 1998, 1999, 2001, 2003

Stadiums and grounds 
The league and tournaments are generally played at the following Stadiums and Grounds:
 Yuba Bharati Krirangan, Salt Lake
 Asia's biggest composite stadium with capacity of around 1,20,000 with Flood Light.
 Important matches of Local League, Shield, I-League and International Matches are played here.

 Vidyasagar Krirangan, Barasat
 Capacity around 20,000 and Flood Light
 Matches of Local League, Shield are played here. It is also used for holding I-League matches also.

 Sailen Manna Stadium, Howrah
 Present capacity is only around 10,000. But ground condition is extremely good.
 Some important CFL matches and IFA Shield are played here.

 Rabindra Sarobar Stadium
 Capacity around 22,000.
 Important League & Shield matches are played here.

 East Bengal/Aryan, Mohun Bagan/CFC and Mohammedan/Howrah Union Ground
 Full capacity of these ground are 23,500, 22,000 and 15,000 respectively. All the grounds have floodlight facilities.
 Most of the League Matches of Premier League and First Division are played here. But these grounds are available for Football only during the period from 16 May to 10 January every year.

 10 Open Grounds in the Maidan
 Only matches of Junior Division and other ordinary competitions are played here. These grounds are available for football only during the period from 16 May to 30 September every year.
 Besides the above-mentioned grounds and stadium, infrastructure of SAI i.e. Sports Authority of India, Kishore Bharati Krirangan are also used.
 Grounds available at various places in Kolkata and Howrah are used for conducting Nursery League Matches. Besides above, small stadiums are also available in almost all the Districts towns and some Sub Divisions. Most important and mentionable stadium is at Siliguri – Kanchenjunga Stadium, where International Tournament like Jawaharlal Nehru Cup was also played. Khardah, Kalyani, Burdwan, Durgapur, Midnapur, Haldia, Malda, Raigunje, Balurghat and a few other District Towns also have Stadium.

 Indoor Stadium
 Netaji Indoor Stadium (AC), Kolkata- Capacity 12,000.

Salt Lake Stadium 

Yuva Bharati Krirangan, commonly known as Salt Lake Stadium, is a multi-purpose stadium in Bidhannagar, Kolkata, West Bengal. It is currently used for football matches and athletics. The stadium was built in 1984 and holds 120,000 people in a three-tier configuration.

It is situated approximately 10 km to the east of the Kolkata downtown and is elliptical in shape. The roof is made of metal tubes and aluminium sheets and concrete. There are two electronic score boards and control rooms. The lighting is uniformly distributed to facilitate nocturnal sports. There are special arrangements for TV broadcasting.

It was inaugurated in January 1984. The salient features of the stadium are unique synthetic track for athletic meets, electronic scoreboard, main football arena measuring 105m x 70m, elevators, VIP enclosures, peripheral floodlighting arrangement from the roof-top, air conditioned VIP rest room and Conference Hall. Other features of the stadium are also commentary boxes for All India Radio and TV along with several platforms for TV cameras, press boxes, dormitories and AC. rooms, player's changing rooms, practice grounds for football, cricket and kho kho, volleyball field and an ultra-medium gymnasium. The stadium has its own water arrangements and standby diesel generation sets.

The floodlights which illuminate the stadium consist of 624 bulbs of 2 kW each and two electronic scoreboards consisting of 36,000 bulbs of 25 watt each. The four underground reservoirs have unique fire-fighting arrangements with a capacity of 10,000 gallons. The architectural and structural design of the stadium was the work of the Joint Consultants viz., M/S. Ballardie, Thompson & Matthews Pvt. Ltd. and M/S. H.K. Sen & Associates – both from Kolkata, West Bengal. The track was prepared by Reckortan Tartan Track, Germany. The electronic scoreboards were supplied by Electro Impex of Hungary.

After its inauguration in January 1984 with the Jawaharlal Nehru International Gold Cup Soccer Tournament, the Salt Lake Stadium has hosted several important international tournaments or matches such as The Pre-World Cup Tournament in 1985, Super-Soccers in 1986, 1989, 1991 and 1994, 3rd S.A.F. games in 1987, U.S.S.R. Festival in 1988, Charminar Challenger Trophy in 1992, Jawaharlal Nehru International Gold Cup in 1995. The chief engineer of the stadium is Somnath Ghosh.

The stadium also hosts different kinds of cultural programs such as dance and music concerts.

Performance in AFC competitions

Asian Club Championship: 1 appearance
Group Stage: 1970

Notable players
Below the players, are notable footballers who represented the West Bengal football team.

  Sailen Manna
  P. K. Banerjee
  Chuni Goswami
  Fred Pugsley
   Mohammed Rahmatullah
   Balai Dey
  Shabbir Ali
  Samar Banerjee
  Jarnail Singh
  Peter Thangaraj
  Krishanu Dey
  Subrata Bhattacharya

Sponsors

See also
 History of football in India
 Football in Kolkata

References

Further reading

External links
 West Bengal football association website (Indian Football Association)
 West Bengal football team at Global Sports Archive

 
Santosh Trophy teams